Consubstantiation is a Christian theological doctrine that (like transubstantiation) describes the real presence of Christ in the Eucharist. It holds that during the sacrament, the substance of the body and blood of Christ are present alongside the substance of the bread and wine, which remain present. 
It was part of the doctrines of Lollardy, and considered a heresy by the Roman Catholic Church. It was later championed by Edward Pusey of the Oxford Movement, and is therefore held by many high church Anglicans.

Development
In England in the late 14th century, there was a political and religious movement known as Lollardy. Among much broader goals, the Lollards affirmed a form of consubstantiation—that the Eucharist remained physically bread and wine, while becoming spiritually the body and blood of Christ. Lollardy survived up until the time of the English Reformation.

Whilst ultimately rejected by him on account of the authority of the Church of Rome, William of Ockham entertains a version of consubstantiation in his Fourth Quodlibet, Question 30, where he claims that "the substance of the bread and the substance of the wine remain there and that the substance of the body of Christ remains in the same place, together with the substance of the bread". 

Literary critic Kenneth Burke's dramatism takes this concept and utilizes it in secular rhetorical theory to look at the dialectic of unity and difference within the context of logology.

The doctrine of consubstantiation is often held in contrast to the doctrine of transubstantiation. 

To explain the manner of Christ's presence in Holy Communion, many high church Anglicans teach the philosophical explanation of consubstantiation. A major leader in the Anglo-Catholic Oxford Movement, Edward Pusey, championed the view of consubstantiation. Pusey's view is that:

The term consubstantiation has been used to describe Martin Luther's Eucharistic doctrine, the sacramental union. Lutheran theologians reject the term because it refers to a philosophical construct that differs from the Lutheran doctrine of the sacramental union, denotes a mixing of substances (bread and wine with body and blood), and suggests a "gross, Capernaitic, carnal" presence of the body and blood of Christ.

See also
Eucharistic theology
Impanation
Real presence of Christ in the Eucharist
Transignification

References 

Lutheran Eucharistic theology
Eucharist
Christian terminology